Patrick Reynolds may refer to:

 Patrick Reynolds (activist) (born 1948), American tobacco scion, anti-smoking activist and former actor
 Patrick Reynolds (Cumann na nGaedheal politician) (1887–1932), Irish Cumann na nGaedheal politician
 Patrick Reynolds (Gaelic footballer), Gaelic footballer
 Patrick J. Reynolds (artist) (born 1963), American visual artist and author
 Patrick J. Reynolds (politician) (1920–2003), his son, Irish Fine Gael politician
 Plain Pat (Patrick Reynolds), songwriter and record producer